The 2007–08 Kansas Jayhawks men's basketball team represented the University of Kansas for the NCAA Division I men's intercollegiate basketball season of 2007–08, which was the Jayhawks' 110th Season. The team was led by Bill Self in his fifth season as head coach.  The team played its home games in Allen Fieldhouse in Lawrence, Kansas.

The Jayhawks finished the season 37–3, 13–3 in Big 12 play to finish tied for first place. They defeated Nebraska, Texas Tech, and Texas A&M to win the Big 12 tournament championship. As a result, they received the conference's automatic bid to the NCAA tournament as the No. 1 seed in the Midwest region. They defeated Memphis in the National Championship game, marking the third tournament title in the school's history and fifth national title overall.

The Jayhawks 37 wins remains a program record. Additionally, the win total is tied for 3rd most in NCAA history (Kentucky twice won 38 and Memphis also won 38, but the wins were officially vacated).

Recruiting

Roster

Schedule

|-
!colspan=9| Exhibition

|-
!colspan=9| Regular season

|-
!colspan=9| Big 12 tournament

|-
!colspan=9| NCAA tournament

Rankings

Awards
Big 12 Sixth Man Award
Sherron Collins (Sophomore, Guard)
Phillips 66 Big 12 Player of the Week
Darnell Jackson (Senior, Forward), January 7 (co-winner)
Brandon Rush (Junior, Guard), March 3 (co-winner)
Sherron Collins, March 9 (co-winner)
All-Big 12 Teams
Darrell Arthur (Sophomore, Forward), First Team
Brandon Rush, First Team
Mario Chalmers (Junior, Guard), Second Team
Darnell Jackson, Third Team
Big 12 All-Defensive Team
Mario Chalmers
Russell Robinson (Senior, Guard)
Phillips 66 Big 12 Championship All-Tournament Team
Brandon Rush, Most Outstanding Player
Mario Chalmers
NCAA (Midwest) Regional All-Tournament Team
Brandon Rush
Mario Chalmers
Sasha Kaun (Senior, Center)
NCAA basketball tournament Most Outstanding Player
Mario Chalmers

References

Kansas Jayhawks men's basketball seasons
Kansas
NCAA Division I men's basketball tournament championship seasons
NCAA Division I men's basketball tournament Final Four seasons
Kansas
Jay
Jay